The overwhelming morphological diversity of the potter wasp species is reflected in the proliferation of genera described to group them into more manageable groups. The following 198 genera are recognized as valid. An additional 16 genera previously treated under this subfamily have been split into the Zethinae.

Genera 
Tribe Eumenini

Afreumenes
Alphamenes
Cyphomenes
Delta
Eumenes
Ischnogasteroides
Katamenes
Laevimenes
Minixi
Omicroides
Omicron
Oreumenes
Pachymenes
Pachyminixi
Pararhaphidoglossa
Phimenes
Pirhosigma
Santamenes
Sphaeromenes
Stenosigma
Zeta

Tribe Odynerini

Abispa
Acanthodynerus
Acarepipona
Acarodynerus
Acarozumia
Aethiopicodynerus
Afrepipona
Afrodynerus
Afrogamma
Afroxanthodynerus
Alastor
Alastoroides
Alastorynerus
Allepipona
Allodynerus
Allorhynchium
Ancistroceroides
Ancistrocerus
Antamenes
Antepipona
Anterhynchium
Antezumia
Antodynerus
Apodynerus
Archancistrocerus
Aruodynerus
Asiodynerus
Astalor
Australodynerus
Brachymenes
Brachyodynerus
Brachypipona
Carinstrocerus
Cephalastor
Cephalochilus
Cephalodynerus
Chelodynerus
Chlorodynerus
Coeleumenes
Convextrocerus
Cuyodynerus
Cyphodynerus
Cyrtalastor
Cyrteumenes
Cyrtolabulus
Diemodynerus
Dolichodynerus
Ectopioglossa
Elisella
Emeryrhynchium
Epiodynerus
Epsilon
Erodynerus
Eudiscoelius
Eumenidiopsis
Eumicrodynerus
Euodynerus
Eustenancistrocerus
Extreuodynerus
Flammodynerus
Flavoleptus
Gamma
Gastrodynerus
Gibberrhynchium
Gioiella
Giordania
Globepipona
Globodynerus
Gribodia
Gymnomerus
Hemipterochilis
Hemipterochilus
Hirtocoelius
Hypalastoroides
Hypancistrocerus
Hypodynerus
Immutatus
Incodynerus
Indodynerus
Intereuodynerus
Interzumia
Irianmenes
Jucancistrocerus
Knemodynerus
Labochilus
Labus
Lamellodynerus
Latimenes
Leptochiloides
Leptochilus
Leptodynerus
Leptomenes
Leptomenoides
Leptomicrodynerus
Leucodynerus
Lissepipona
Lissodynerus
Malagassodynerus
Malayepipona
Malgachemenes
Maricopodynerus
Megaodynerus
Micreumenes
Microdynerus
Mitrodynerus
Monobia
Monodynerus
Montezumia
Nesodynerus
Nestocoelius
Nirtenia
Nortozumia
Odynerus
Okinawepipona
Omicrabulus
Onychopterocheilus
Orancistrocerus
Oreumenoides
Orientalicesa 
Ovodynerus
Pachodynerus
Paragymnomerus
Paralastor
Paraleptomenes
Paralionotulus
Parancistrocerus
Pararrhynchium
Paravespa
Parazumia
Pareumenes
Parifodynerus
Parodontodynerus
Parodynerus
Plagiolabra
Polistepipona
Postepipona
Proepipona
Pseudabispa
Pseudacaromenes
Pseudagris
Pseudalastor
Pseudepipona
Pseudochilus
Pseudodontodynerus
Pseudodynerus
Pseudoleptochilus
Pseudonortonia
Pseudosymmorphus
Pseudozumia
Pseumenes
Pterocheilus
Raphiglossoides
Rhynchagris
Rhynchalastor
Rhynchium
Rugomenes
Smeringodynerus
Spinilabochilus
Stellepipona
Stenancistrocerus
Stenodyneriellus
Stenodynerus
Stenonartonia
Stroudia
Subancistrocerus
Symmorphoides
Symmorphus
Synagris
Syneuodynerus
Tachyancistrocerus
Tachymenes
Trachyodynerus
Tricarinodynerus
Tropidodynerus
Tuleara
Ubirodynerus
Xanthodynerus
Xenorhynchium

References

Carpenter, J.M. 1986. A synonymic generic checklist of the Eumeninae (Hymenoptera: Vespidae). Psyche 93: 61–90.
Carpenter, J.M., J. Gusenleitner & M. Madl. 2009. A Catalogue of the Eumeninae (Hymenoptera: Vespidae) of the Ethiopian Region excluding Malagasy Subregion. Part I: Introduction, Key to Genera, Genera Aethiopicodynerus Gusenleitner 1997 to Cyrtolabulus van der Vecht 1969. Linzer Biologischer Beitrage 41 (1): 513-638.
Carpenter, J.M., J. Gusenleitner & M. Madl. 2010a. A Catalogue of the Eumeninae (Hymenoptera: Vespidae) of the Ethiopian Region excluding Malagasy Subregion. Part II: Genera Delta de Saussure 1885 to Zethus Fabricius 1804 and species incertae sedis. Linzer Biologischer Beitrage 42 (1): 95-315.
Carpenter, J.M., J. Gusenleitner & M. Madl. 2010b. A Catalogue of the Eumeninae (Hymenoptera: Vespidae) of the Ethiopian Region excluding Malagasy Subregion. Part III: Classification, additions, corrections and index. Linzer Biologischer Beitrage 42 (2): 919-1004.

 List